The 2012 ABL season is the third season for the Singapore Slingers in the ABL.

Off-season

On 15 November 2011, the Slingers announced that they will add 3 new imports -  Centre Donald Little, Forward Louis Graham, and Filipino-American point guard Don Dulay - to bolster their line-up for the upcoming Season 3 of the AirAsia ASEAN Basketball.

On 27 November 2011, the Slingers announced the return of their head coach, Neo Beng Siang, for the upcoming season.

On 29 November 2011, the Slingers announced the signings of a trio of local players - Guards Desmond Oh and Wei Long Wong, and Forward Shengyu Lim.

References

2012
2011–12 in Singaporean basketball
2012 ABL season